The Rolls-Royce Condor aircraft piston engine was a larger version of the Rolls-Royce Eagle developing up to . The engine first ran in 1918 and a total of 327 engines were recorded as being built.

Variants
Note:
Condor I
(1920-1921) 600 hp, 72 built at Derby.
Condor IA
Alternative designation for Condor II.
Condor II
(1921) 650 hp, revised propeller reduction gear ratio, increased compression ratio (5.17:1). 34 built at Derby.
Condor III
(1923-1927) 650/670 hp, compression ratio 6.5:1, Re-designed connecting rods. 196 built at Derby.
Condor IIIA
(1925) 650/665 hp. Improved main bearing design and material.
Condor IIIB
(1930) 650 hp, 0.477:1 reduction gear, re-designed crankcase and crankshaft.
Condor IV
(1925) 750 hp. Direct-drive, modified engine mounting. 13 built at Derby.
Condor IVA
(1927) 750 hp. Nine built at Derby.
Condor V
(1925) As Condor IIIA with two-stage turbocharger. Run but not flown, one built at Derby.
Condor VII
Direct-drive Condor IIIA, two built at Derby. 
Condor C.I.
(1932) 480 hp, compression ignition (diesel), two engines tested and flown.

Compression ignition (diesel) variant

In 1932 the Air Ministry initiated a conversion of the Condor petrol engine to the compression ignition system. The conversion was developed at the Royal Aircraft Establishment, Farnborough, with the co-operation of Rolls-Royce Ltd. Engine layout, bore, and stroke remained the same as for the petrol version; the compression ratio increased to 12.5:1. At its maximum 2,000 rpm the engine developed 500 hp (373 kW), giving a power/weight ratio of 0.33 hp/lb.

The engine passed the 50-hour civil type test for compression ignition engines, being only the second British engine to do so. The only previous engine to pass this test was the much larger Beardmore Tornado fitted to the R101 airship. The diesel Condor was experimentally flown in a Hawker Horsley to explore the practical operation of a diesel engine in flight.

Applications

The Condor was used in the following aircraft:

Specifications (Condor III)

See also

References

Notes

Bibliography

 Lumsden, Alec. British Piston Engines and their Aircraft. Marlborough, Wiltshire: Airlife Publishing, 2003. .

External links

Photo of a Diesel version of the Condor at oldengine.org 

Condor
1910s aircraft piston engines
Airship engines